The Irving Group of Companies is an informal name given to those companies owned and controlled by the descendants of Canadian industrialist K.C. Irving, namely his children J.K. (b. 1928), Arthur (b. 1930), and Jack (1932–2010) and their respective children.

Ownership structure
Many of the components of the Irving Group of Companies were established or acquired by K.C. Irving during his period of active entrepreneurship between the 1920s and the 1970s.  Following his retirement to Bermuda in the 1970s, the conglomerate was operated by his three sons in much the same manner and remained relatively intact and maintained a strong vertical integration.  The companies were divided into similar divisions, each controlled by one of K.C. Irving's sons and their respective children.

 James K. Irving (b. 1928) (also known as "J.K.") – ownership and responsibility for J.D. Irving, Limited and its subsidiaries. This conglomerate has interests in several industries including forestry, integrated forest products, building supplies, frozen food, transportation, shipping lines, and shipbuilding.
 Arthur Irving (b. 1930) (also known as "Art") - ownership and responsibility for Irving Oil and its subsidiaries. This conglomerate has ownership of its retail stores, oil refineries, oil tankers and distribution terminals and facilities.
 John E. Irving (1932–2010) (also known as "Jack") – This conglomerate has ownership of “Ocean Capital” which includes companies such as, Commercial Properties, OSCO Construction Group, Source Atlantic and Acadia Broadcasting, Limited.

J.D. Irving, Limited
J.D. Irving, Ltd. (holding company)

 Irving Forest Products & Services
 Irving Pulp & Paper Ltd.
 Irving Paper Ltd.
 Irving Tissue Co. Ltd.
 Lake Utopia Paper
 Irving Sawmill Division
 Irving Woodlands Division

 JDI Integrated Logistics (formerly Irving Transportation Services)
 New Brunswick Railway Co. Ltd.
 New Brunswick Southern Railway Co. Ltd.
 Eastern Maine Railway Co. Ltd.
 Maine Northern Railway Co. Ltd.
 Midland Transport
 Midland Courier
 RST Industries
 Sunbury Transport
 Atlantic Towing
 Kent Line
 JDI Logistics
 Harbour Development

Irving Shipbuilding & Fabrication Services
Saint John Shipbuilding
Halifax Shipyard
East Isle Shipyard
Shelburne Ship Repair
Woodside Industries
Fleetway, Inc.
Oceanic Consulting Corporation

 Irving Retail & Distribution Services
 Chandler
 Kent Building Supplies
 Kent Homes
 Universal Truck & Trailer
 Shamrock Truss
 Atlas Structural Systems
 J&H Industries
 Industrial Commercial Supplies (ICS)
 Economy Drywall
 Cavendish Agri Services

 Irving Consumer Products
 Irving Tissue (Royale, Majesta, Scotties (U.S.), private labels)
 Irving Personal Care (diapers, training pants)
 Cavendish Produce (fresh vegetables)
 Cavendish Farms (frozen potato processing)
 Indian River Farms
 Riverdale Foods
 Master Packaging

 Industrial Equipment & Construction
 Irving Wallboard
 Gulf Operators
 Irving Equipment (crane rental, heavy lifting, specialized transportation, pile driving and project management services)
 CFM
 Pumps Plus

 Specialty Printing
 Plasticraft

 Personnel Services
 Protrans Personnel Services Inc.

 Security Services
 Industrial Security Inc.

 Amateur Sports
Moncton Wildcats

 Brunswick News
 Telegraph-Journal (Saint John NB)
 Times & Transcript (Moncton NB)
 The Daily Gleaner (Fredericton NB)
 The Tribune (Campbellton NB)
 La Voix du Restigouche (Campbellton NB)
 The Bugle-Observer (Woodstock NB)
 Le Journal Madawaska (Edmundston NB)
 L'Étoile (various editions)
 Édition provinciale
 Édition La Cataracte (Grand Falls NB)
 Édition Chaleur (Bathurst NB)
 Édition Dieppe (Dieppe NB)
 Édition Kent (Bouctouche NB)
 Édition Péninsule (Shippagan NB)
 Édition République (Edmundston NB)
 Édition Restigouche (Campbellton NB)
 Édition Shédiac (Shediac NB)
 Kings County Record (Sussex NB)
 Miramichi Leader (Miramichi NB)
 The Northern Light (Bathurst NB)
 Here (Saint John NB, Moncton NB, Fredericton NB)

 Former subsidiaries
 Acadian Lines Ltd.
 SMT (Eastern) Ltd. Bus Lines
 Saint John City Transit
 Irving Industrial Rentals
 Lexi-Tech International
 Barrington Environmental Services
 Barrington Industrial Services
 Commercial Equipment
 Maritime Tire
 M.I.T.I (Xwave)
 Hawk Communications
 Steel and Engine Products Ltd.
 Scot Truck
 MITV (now CIHF-DT and CHNB-DT)
 CHSJ-TV (now CBAT-DT)

Irving Oil, Limited

Irving Refineries
Irving Energy Services Ltd. (home heating fuel)
Irving Energy Distribution and Marketing
Irving Propane (formerly named Atlantic Speedy Propane)
Irving Aviation (supplier of aviation fuel & ownership of FBO’s in Newfoundland)
Portage Energy Limited
Override
Canaport (deepwater ultra large crude carrier terminal)
Canaport LNG (25% partner in deepwater liquified natural gas terminal, 75% held by Repsol YPF)
Irving Blending & Packaging (automotive & commercial vehicle lubricants and degreasers)
Over 1200 retail locations throughout Eastern Canada and New England including several Big Stops
A fleet of tractor-trailers delivering a variety of fuels to its wholesale, commercial and retail customers
Over a dozen regional distribution terminals

Ocean Capital
 Source Atlantic (a group of several companies Gilco Bearings, Mobile Valve, Thornes, Rubber & Rigging, Engineered Products & Services, NL Eldridge, Schooner Industrial, Millennium Welding, Moore Industrial Edmonton Regina Saskatoon Winnipeg and Calgary)
 PetroService, Limited
 Commercial Properties Limited
 OSCO Construction Group 
 Steel
 Ocean Steel Ltd. (structural steel & rebar)
 Ocean Steel Corp. (structural steel)
 Allstar Rebar
 York Steel
 Concrete
 Strescon Ltd. (prestressed cast concrete)
 Borcherdt Concrete Products
 OSCO Concrete
 OSCO Aggregates
 Construction (commercial, institutional and industrial construction)
 FCC Construction & Engineering
 Marque Construction
 Acadia Broadcasting Ltd. (formerly New Brunswick Broadcasting Company)
A selection of the 17 radio stations owned and operated by Acadia Broadcasting
CKBW-FM, CJHK-FM (Bridgewater NS)
 CHSJ-FM, CHWV-FM (Saint John NB)
 CHTD-FM (St. Stephen NB)
Northwoods Broadcasting Ltd.
CKDR-FM (Dryden ON)
 CFOB-FM (Fort Frances ON)
 CJRL-FM (Kenora ON)
 CKTG-FM, CJUK-FM (Thunder Bay ON)

Criticisms

Lack of transparency
Irving companies are private companies; as a result, there is less public information available as there would be for publicly traded corporations. This lack of transparency has led to significant criticism regarding Irving business activities.

Vertical integration
Irving companies are often criticized for their vertical integration. Examples of vertical integration within the "Irving Group of Companies" (as the Irving family refers to their holdings) include the acquisition or formation of businesses along the entire chain of production, from the Irving refinery (an Irving Oil subsidiary) and its retail outlets, to the transportation subsidiaries of J.D. Irving (RST, Midland, NB Southern, Sunbury), to various construction and engineering companies that assist in building, maintaining and expanding the conglomerate's facilities. 

Further examples of vertical integration within the conglomerate include Industrial Security Ltd. (ISL), the wholly owned security company that guards facilities, as well as industrial suppliers such as Thornes, Universal Sales and Commercial Equipment Ltd. which provide specialty goods and services to its companies. J.D. Irving, the sister firm to Irving Oil, is a dominant forestry company in northeastern North America, growing trees, harvesting trees and producing lumber, pulp and paper, and various enhanced value products such as glossy paper grades, tissue, and personal care products.

Provincial media monopoly
The Dominion newspaper, an independent Canadian newspaper, has criticized Irving's ownership of Brunswick News, which published most newspapers in New Brunswick, as well as the newspapers' journalistic integrity, particularly when reporting on companies controlled by the Irving family such as Irving Oil. Canadian Business magazine wrote in a profile of the Irving Group in 2008, "A Senate committee that recently probed media ownership in Canada expressed concerns about the family’s near-monopoly over the province’s print media and "the implications of a dominant media force linked to a dominant industrial base." While a Brunswick News official denied any pro-Irving bias in the papers’ coverage, the committee’s 2006 report cited other witnesses who feared that Irving journalists exercise restraint and self-edit when writing about the family — "unconscious loyalty to the parental control," as one put it."

Political patronage
In 2003, there were accusations of Irving family political patronage, notably involving Allan Rock and Claudette Bradshaw of the Liberal Party of Canada.  In 2016, the National Observer released an eight-part investigation on the family called House of Irving. It looked at many parts of the businesses including the expansion into Maine, its media monopoly, how they intimidate their critics and issues within the family.

Ecological degradation

Irving-owned facilities have been shown to emit a mixture of carcinogens, including benzene and lead. In 2009, the Conservation Council of New Brunswick produced a study which found that rates of lung cancer were 40 to 50 percent higher in Saint John than in Fredericton and Moncton – New Brunswick’s other major cities.  In 2018 the Irving Pulp and Paper Ltd. pleaded guilty to three charges under the federal Fisheries Act related to numerous "significant" instances of effluent discharges from its pulp mill in west Saint John into the St. John River over a two-year period.  This was the fourth time that this fine was issued in a period of two years.

References

External links
 J.D. Irving Ltd
 Irving Oil
 Ocean Capital
 OSCO Construction Group

Companies based in New Brunswick
Privately held companies of Canada
Family-owned companies of Canada